Don Nelson Page, (born December 31, 1948) is an American-born Canadian theoretical physicist at the University of Alberta, Canada.

Work
Page's work focuses on quantum cosmology and theoretical gravitational physics, and he is noted for being a doctoral student of Stephen Hawking, in addition to publishing several journal articles with him. 
Page got his BA at William Jewell College in the United States in 1971, attaining an MS in 1972 and a PhD in 1976 at Caltech.

His professional career started as a research assistant in Cambridge from 1976-1979, followed by an assistant professorship at Penn State from 1979-1983, and then an associate professor at Penn State until 1986 before taking on the title of professor in 1986. Page spent four more years at Penn State before moving to become a professor at the University of Alberta in Canada in 1990.

Awards and honors
In 2012, Page became a Fellow of the Royal Society of Canada.

Religious views
Page is an Evangelical Christian. In commenting on the debate between William Lane Craig and Sean Carroll in 2014, he states in a guest post on Carroll's website that: "...in view of all the evidence, including both the elegance of the laws of physics, the existence of orderly sentient experiences, and the historical evidence, I do believe that God exists and think the world is actually simpler if it contains God than it would have been without God." In the same post he criticises William Lane Craig's Kalam Cosmological Argument, saying that it "is highly dubious metaphysically, depending on contingent intuitions [i.e. the first premise] we have developed from living in a universe with relatively simple laws of physics and with a strong thermodynamic arrow of time."

References

External links
 Don Page's personal web site (archived)

Canadian evangelicals
Canadian physicists
California Institute of Technology alumni
Living people
Academic staff of the University of Alberta
1948 births
People from Bethel, Alaska
Fellows of the Royal Society of Canada
William Jewell College alumni